Ireland Blyth Ltd. (IBL) is the largest business group in Mauritius with a turnover of over 16 billion Mauritian rupees (approx. US$467 million) as of 2015 listed on the Stock Exchange of Mauritius. It operates in Commerce, Engineering, Financial Services, Logistics, Aviation & Shipping, Retail, Seafood & Marine sectors under various names, representing over 200 brands and employs over 6,000 people 

In 2008 the company was reported as the largest company in Mauritius per their net sales revenues.

History 
It was incorporated in 1972 following the merger of two leading companies which had been trading in Mauritius since the early 19th Century, namely Blyth Brothers, founded in 1830 by James Blyth, and Ireland Fraser & Co. Ltd.  Ireland Fraser & Co. Ltd was founded on the 1st July 1850 by George Ireland, Hugh Hunter and James Fraser. The original name was Hunter Ireland & Co., but when Hugh Hunter left the company in 1860, the name was changed to Ireland Fraser & Co.  It became Ireland Fraser & Co. Ltd. in 1927.

In 1994 the group became a public company and was admitted to the official list of the Stock Exchange of Mauritius.

Notable subsidiaries

BrandActiv  
Created in 2011 from the merger of IBL Consumer Goods and IBL Frozen Foods, BrandActiv is involved in the importation and distribution of consumer goods in Mauritius. Amongst more than 100 brands that it represents, international brands include L'Oréal, Kraft foods, Colgate Palmolive, Johnson & Johnson and H.J.Heinz.

The earliest predecessor of BrandActiv, Cold Storage (became New Cold Storage in 1970 and then IBL Frozen Foods in 1996) was the first importer of frozen meat in Mauritius from Australia in the 1900s.

Chantier Naval de l'Océan Indien  
Chantier Naval de l'Océan Indien (CNOI), established in 2001, is involved in the construction, repair and maintenance (including dry-docking) of vessels in Port Louis.

It was founded as a joint venture between IBL and Chantier Piriou of Concarneau, France before IBL took a 60% controlling stake.

The shipyard's facilities include a covered building berth and slipway for the construction of vessels and vessel sections up to 50 metres long,  a dry-dock (130 metres long, 27 metres wide), a ship elevator of 1400 tons and 350 metres of quays which can accommodate ships with a draft reaching up to 8.5 metres for repairs afloat.

Ships worked on by the company includes frigates of the French Navy to French and Spanish tunny boats, trawlers, small oil and gas tankers and yachts. Regular customers include the French Navy, which signed a contract for the maintenance and repair of its frigates and patrol ships operating in the Indian Ocean, Sapmer of Reunion island and Austral Fisheries of Australia.

Notable construction projects include a 35-metre patrol ship for Madagascar, a 39-metre barge for Mayotte, and a trawler and a long-liner for Reunion. CNOI also enlarged an Australian fishing boat by 8 metres.

Winner's supermarkets 
Winner's is an integrated chain of 20 supermarkets established in 1994 operating in the retail segment of the group. Its turnover of MUR 5.5 billion represented 35% of the turnover of the group in 2015. IBL took 100% stake in the company (from its previous 51%) in 2015.

Scomat 
Scomat operates in the engineering segment of the group and provides products and professional services in the field of earthmoving and agricultural equipment, generators, uninterruptible power supply, hydraulics & diesel.

It is also a dealership for Caterpillar in Mauritius, the agreement dating to 1929 between Caterpillar and one of IBL's predecessor, Blyth Brothers.

Mauritian Eagle Insurance Company Limited 
Mauritian Eagle Insurance Company Limited (SEM: MEI) is a provider of personal and commercial insurance. It was created in 1973 as a joint venture between Ireland Blyth Limited and South African Eagle Insurance Company Limited (now part of the Zurich Group) and listed on the Stock Exchange of Mauritius in 1993.

In 2007, the company became the first in the Indian Ocean (and in Mauritius) to obtain the ISO 27001 certification relating to information security.

See also
Economy of Mauritius
List of Mauritian companies

References

Conglomerate companies of Mauritius
Companies based in Port Louis